The Opel Combo is a panel van and leisure activity vehicle from the German automaker Opel. The Combo first appeared in 1993, a second generation model was introduced in 2001, and the third was manufactured from December 2011 to December 2017, based on the Fiat Doblò. The name "Combo" was previously applied as a suffix to a three-door panel van body style of Opel Kadett E from 1986 until 1993.

Opel/Vauxhall joined Groupe PSA in March 2017: the fourth generation Combo, launched in March 2018, shares the platform and bodywork of the Peugeot Rifter and Partner, as well as the Citroën Berlingo.

The Combo B and Combo C share platforms, vital components and some body panels with contemporary subcompact Opel Corsas, which used to be a typical pedigree for such a vehicle. The generations are denoted B and C in typical Opel fashion, but Holden applied the codes SB and XC respectively, reflecting the relation with SB and XC Holden Barinas (Opel Corsa B and C, respectively).

Kadett Combo (Combo A; 1986) 

The Opel Kadett Combo was introduced in January 1986, and finished production in August 1993. It was based on the Opel Kadett E small family car. It was built in the United Kingdom, at Ellesmere Port by Vauxhall until January 1989. This was when the model was facelifted, with a new grille separate from the bumper (as for the Kadett).

At the same time, production was transferred to Azambuja, Portugal and the vans were now built by Opel. In Germany, it was sold with a 1.3 litre petrol engine or a 1.6 (later 1.7) litre diesel unit. The 1.3 petrol unit was then changed to a 1.4. Buyers in some countries, including the United Kingdom, also had the choice of a  1.6-liter petrol unit.

In the United Kingdom, the three door estate based van was known as both the Bedford and Vauxhall Astravan, and the high roof van as the Bedford Astramax, later sold as a Vauxhall. The changeover from Bedford to Vauxhall took place on 1 June 1990, as Bedfords were better known as a producer of heavier trucks.

The Astramax was available in base or somewhat better equipped L versions. Both models were offered in 365 or 560 versions, referring to the payload in kilograms.

Combo B (1993-2001) 

The first generation of Combo, launched in October 1993, was based heavily on the Opel Corsa B, launched six months earlier. The front part (up to the B-pillar) is practically identical with the Corsa (except for the roof spoiler), but the platform (and thus wheelbase and the body in general) is extended to accommodate a tall, boxy cargo compartment, capable of carrying a Europallet.

The Combo B had symmetrical twin rear doors that opened to the side (rather than a single tailgate). These are counted as a single "door" when referring to the body style as three door.

Following the increasing popularity of leisure activity vehicles, Opel launched a five passenger version of the Combo in the summer of 1995, called Opel Combo Tour. It differed from the panel van version by having the cargo section fitted with side windows, and a three-passenger split folding bench seat.

Although Combo's primary market was Europe, it has also been sold on other continents, in markets where GM traditionally use Opel derived models. As the Azambuja Opel plant in Portugal is the sole production site of all Combos, all those models were replaced gradually with the Combo C in 2001.

The Combo was also produced in relatively small numbers by SAIC subsidiary SAIC-Yizheng as the "Shanghai Auto (Shangqi) Saibao SAC6420", equipped with the same 1.6 litre engine and five speed manual transmission as the Buick Sail. Built from 2002 until 2005, there was also a DeLuxe version available, with alloy wheels and other extras.

Holden in Australia launched the SB series Combo in February 1996. It offered the 1.4 litre C14NZ engine, upgraded to C14SE specification in 1997. Sales continued until 2002, although the last SB Combos were built in 2001, but complianced as models of 2002. Production of the Combo A ended in August 2001.

Gallery

Names and markets 
 Opel Combo – Europe (except for United Kingdom) and Chile before the rebranding in the end of the 1990s
 Vauxhall Combo – United Kingdom
 Holden Combo – Australia, New Zealand
 Chevrolet Combo – Chile
Shanghai Auto Saibao SAC6420 - China

Engines 
 1.4 L I4 8V ,  Ecotec
 1.6 L I4 8V  Ecotec
 1.7 L I4 8V  Circle-L Diesel

Combo C (2002-2012) 

The second generation was launched at the Frankfurt Motor Show, in September 2001. While most competitors severed their connections with their subcompact brethren, Opel decided to base the vehicle on the Corsa again. The use of subcompact Gamma platform constrained the overall width of the vehicle. The front clip is thus still shared with the Corsa, although now only back to the A-pillar. This allowed Opel to more fully integrate the overall design of the car, giving it a "flush" look more in line with its competitors.

Compared to previous generation, the Combo C gained sliding rear side doors (versions with either single passenger side door or double doors are available). Sales began in January 2002.

An Opel Combo Tour version was also introduced, followed by Opel Combo Tour Tramp (Combo Tour Arizona in some markets), in an effort to attract leisure activity vehicle buyers. Combo Tour Tramp/Arizona was thought as a more off road recreational vehicle.

It features enhanced suspension tuning, increased ground clearance, chassis protection covers and numerous styling details that differentiate it from standard Combo Tours, with the intention to conjure a sturdy, outdoor sports related image. The Combo Tour was not offered by Vauxhall in the United Kingdom. Commercial van versions retained the symmetrical twin rear doors, while the Tour versions have an option of a single tailgate (opening to the top). The tailgate is standard on Tour Tramp/Arizona.

In December 2006, the Azambuja, Portugal factory closed down, and the production of the Opel Combo transferred to Zaragoza, Spain in 2007. Holden in Australia launched the XC series Combo in September 2002. It offered the 1.6 litre Z16SE engine, upgraded to 1.4 litre Z14XEP specification in December 2004 for the MY05 update.

Although production ended in the end of 2011, Holden in Australia and New Zealand stockpiled sufficient Combo inventory to last until 2013, with the final 2011 build vehicles complianced in the beginning of 2012. In August 2013, CarAdvice announced that the Holden Combo had been quietly discontinued, and will not be replaced by the Combo D, available to European customers.

Production of the Combo C ended in the end of 2011, in time for the December 2011 launch of the Combo D, which is based on the Fiat Doblò.

Gallery

Names and markets 
 Opel Combo – Europe (except for United Kingdom) and Singapore
 Vauxhall Combo – United Kingdom
 Holden Combo – Australia, New Zealand
 Chevrolet Combo – Chile

Engines 
 1.3L 1.3 CDTI Ecotec
 1.4L I4 16V DOHC TwinPort Ecotec
 1.6L I4 8V SOHC Ecotec
 1.6L I4 16V DOHC CNG Ecotec
 1.3L I4 16V DOHC CDTI
 1.7L (Y17DTL) I4 16V DOHC DI 65bhp
 1.7L (Y17DT) I4 16V DOHC DTI 75bhp
 1.7L (Z17DTH) I4 16V DOHC CDTI

Combo D (2012-2018) 

The third generation Combo was manufactured from January 2012 to December 2018, and was based on the Fiat Doblò. The third generation Combo was manufactured in Turkey by Tofaş. Sales began in January 2012.

Gallery

Engines

Combo E (K9; 2018) 

The fourth generation Combo was unveiled at the 2018 Geneva Motor Show. It is a sister model to the Citroën Berlingo and Peugeot Rifter and Partner, as Groupe PSA bought Opel in March 2017.

Gallery

Notes

References

External links 

 Official Opel Combo website

Combo
Euro NCAP small MPVs
Vans
Mini MPVs
Front-wheel-drive vehicles
1990s cars
2000s cars
2010s cars
Vehicles introduced in 1994
Cars of Turkey